The Cordovan hat (in Spanish, sombrero cordobés) is a traditional hat made in the city of Córdoba, Spain and traditionally worn in a large part of Andalusia. In the Spanish-speaking world outside of Andalusia, the term can simply mean "wide-brimmed hat".

Characteristics

Although the most traditional color is black, other common colors include red, pearl gray, sea green and, navy blue.

History
The origin of the style is unclear. Drawings as early as the 17th century show day laborers wearing this sort of hat. The style became more widespread in the late 19th and early 20th centuries.

Among the people who have worn the sombrero cordobés are flamenco vocalist Juanito Valderrama, the rejoneador Antonio Cañero—so identified with the style that the hat is sometimes called a cañero—and the matador Manolete. It can also be seen in the paintings of Julio Romero de Torres.

The Beatles, on their visit to Spain, wore it as a symbol of the country. Former football player Finidi George of Real Betis always wore it when celebrating after scoring during his time there.

The fictional characters Zorro and Black Hat (from Priest (2011)) are often depicted wearing this style of hat.
Predecessor of the modern American Cowboy hat who originated from the Mexican vaquero traditions.

Notes

External links 

  Miguel García Capilla, El Sombrero Cordobés

Hats
Andalusian culture
Spanish clothing
Córdoba, Spain